Curt Warburton (born 1981) is an English mixed martial artist from Coundon, County Durham. He formerly trained at Wolfslair MMA Academy in Liverpool, England.

Mixed martial arts career

Early career
Warburton's most notable achievement in the domestic circuit is his 1–1–1 record against The Ultimate Fighter 9 Lightweight Winner Ross Pearson. The first two fights took place at the semi-professional level, at Total Combat (UK) 18 and 19, which resulted in a draw in their first bout (in November 2006) and a submission (armbar) victory for Pearson (in February 2007). Warburton would gain a measure of revenge in September 2007, when he was victorious via TKO (doctor stoppage) in the only bout to feature on both competitors' professional records.

In February 2009, Warburton was entered into the draw for the British Fighting Championship organisation, which was intended to be one of the top tournaments in England, to serve as a showground for the top domestic fighters to participate in a knockout style tournament. Warburton was drawn against top domestic prospect in Che Mills.

However, a few months later, just before the start of the organisation's tournaments, the organisation was forced to disband due to the lack of progress in securing a television deal and financial issues, which meant the Mills fight was scrapped. This failure led to Warburton, who signed a contract months in advance, failing to compete, which led to over a year's gap between fights for Warburton. He finally returned against Toon Van Thielen and was victorious via submission (guillotine choke).

Warburton's final pre-UFC fight was against Tom Maguire and Warburton was victorious via unanimous decision. This win won him the Strike and Submit Lightweight title.

Ultimate Fighting Championship
Warburton, along with Wolfslair teammates Rob Broughton and Tom Blackledge joined the UFC. Shortly after joining the UFC, former opponent Ross Pearson gave Warburton a big endorsement of his skills, stating: "I expect big things from Curt, he's a good guy, he's a good friend now even if we have had three wars together."

Warburton made his UFC debut against UFC veteran, Spencer Fisher on 16 October 2010 at UFC 120. He lost the fight via unanimous decision.

Warburton faced Maciej Jewtuszko on 27 February 2011 at UFC 127. He handed Jewtuszko his first professional loss via unanimous decision (29–28, 29–28, 29–28).

Warburton next faced Joe Lauzon on 26 June 2011 at UFC on Versus 4. He lost the fight via first round submission. Following the loss, Warburton was released from the UFC.

BAMMA
Warburton made his BAMMA debut against Tim Newman on 10 December 2011 at BAMMA 8. He won the fight via unanimous decision.

Next he faced Lee Wieczorek at BAMMA 10 on 15 September 2012, where he continued his winning streak via unanimous decision to earn himself a BAMMA British Lightweight Title shot.

Warburton received that title shot against Stevie Ray on 9 March 2013 at BAMMA 12.  He won the fight via unanimous decision to become the new BAMMA British Lightweight champion.

Cage Warriors
Warburton made his Cage Warriors debut against Wesley Murch in December 2013. He win the fight in the 1st round via rear naked choke. The fight was a catchweight bout and se Curt on the part to a Lightweight title shot.

Warburton was supposed to fight the Lightweight champion in Jordan but the champion decided to rescind his title and step aside.

Warburton faced Stevie Ray at Cage Warriors 69 on 7 June 2014 on Super Saturday for the vacant Cage Warriors Lightweight Title.  He lost the bout via split decision.

BAMMA
After a break of over 3 years Warburton returned to action with BAMMA on their return to his native North East. He won the bout against Warren Kee via TKO in the 1st round.

Mixed martial arts record

|-
| Win
| align=center| 14–6
| Warren Kee
| TKO (punches)
| BAMMA 33
| 
| align=center| 1
| align=center| 1:05
| Newcastle, England
| 
|-
| Loss
| align=center| 13–6
| Stevie Ray
| Submission (rear-naked choke)
| Cage Warriors 73
| 
| align=center| 2
| align=center| 2:00
| Newcastle, England
| 
|-
| Loss
| align=center| 13–5
| Stevie Ray
| Decision (split)
| Cage Warriors Fighting Championship 69
| 
| align=center| 5
| align=center| 5:00
| London, England
| 
|-
| Win
| align=center| 13–4
| Wesley Murch
| Submission (standing rear-naked choke)
| Cage Warriors 62
| 
| align=center| 1
| align=center| 0:49
| Newcastle upon Tyne, England
| 
|-
| Loss
| align=center| 12–4
| Mansour Barnaoui
| TKO (punches & elbows)
| BAMMA 13: Night of Champions
| 
| align=center| 1
| align=center| 4:08
| Birmingham, England
| 
|-
| Win
| align=center| 12–3
| Stevie Ray
| Decision (unanimous)
| BAMMA 12: Walhead vs. Veach
| 
| align=center| 5
| align=center| 5:00
| Newcastle upon Tyne, England
| 
|-
| Win
| align=center| 11–3
| Lee Wieczorek
| Decision (unanimous)
| BAMMA 10: Sinclair vs. Winner
| 
| align=center| 3
| align=center| 5:00
| London, England
| 
|-
| Win
| align=center| 10–3
| Declan Larkin
| Submission (triangle armbar)
| Total Combat 46
| 
| align=center| 1
| align=center| 1:04
| Spennymoor, England
| 
|-
| Win
| align=center| 9–3
| Artur Sowinski
| Submission (arm-triangle choke)
| KSW 18
| 
| align=center| 2
| align=center| 3:03
| Plock, Poland
| 
|-
| Win
| align=center| 8–3
| Tim Newman
| Decision (unanimous)
| BAMMA 8: Manuwa vs. Rea
| 
| align=center| 3
| align=center| 5:00
| Birmingham, England
| 
|-
| Loss
| align=center| 7–3
| Joe Lauzon
| Submission (triangle kimura)
| UFC Live: Kongo vs. Barry
| 
| align=center| 1
| align=center| 1:58
| Pittsburgh, Pennsylvania, United States
| 
|-
| Win
| align=center| 7–2
| Maciej Jewtuszko
| Decision (unanimous)
| UFC 127: Penn vs. Fitch
| 
| align=center| 3
| align=center| 5:00
| Sydney, Australia
| 
|-
| Loss
| align=center| 6–2
| Spencer Fisher
| Decision (unanimous)
| UFC 120: Bisping vs. Akiyama
| 
| align=center| 3
| align=center| 5:00
| London, England
| 
|-
| Win
| align=center| 6–1
| Tom Maguire
| Decision (unanimous)
| Strike and Submit 12
| 
| align=center| 3
| align=center| 5:00
| Gateshead, England
| 
|-
| Win
| align=center| 5–1
| Toon Van Thielen
| Submission (guillotine choke)
| OMMAC 1 – Assassins
| 
| align=center| 1
| align=center| 1:34
| Liverpool, England
| 
|-
| Loss
| align=center| 4–1
| Will Burke
| Submission (armbar)
| MMA Total Combat 24
| 
| align=center| 1
| align=center| 1:00
| Durham, England
| 
|-
| Win
| align=center| 4–0
| Jamie McKenzie
| TKO (punches)
| MMA Total Combat 23
| 
| align=center| 1
| align=center| 4:20
| Durham, England
| 
|-
| Win
| align=center| 3–0
| Ross Pearson
| TKO (doctor stoppage)
| MMA Total Combat 21
| 
| align=center| 1
| align=center| N/A
| Durham, England
| 
|-
| Win
| align=center| 2–0
| Ian Margerison
| TKO (punches)
| MMA Total Combat 21
| 
| align=center| 1
| align=center| 2:43
| Durham, England
| 
|-
| Win
| align=center| 1–0
| Mark Mills
| TKO (punches)
| Ultimate Force 5
| 
| align=center| 1
| align=center| 3:42
| Doncaster, England
|

References

External links
 
 

1981 births
Living people
Sportspeople from Bishop Auckland
English male mixed martial artists
Lightweight mixed martial artists
Welterweight mixed martial artists
Ultimate Fighting Championship male fighters
People from Coundon
Sportspeople from County Durham